The Culture & Science City (مدينة الثقافة و العلوم) is a gathering of private higher institutes of education in Egypt, composed of ten specialized higher institutes all recognized by the Supreme Council of Egyptian universities. Its institutes contain nearly thirty scientific departments in various disciplines, including engineering, administration, and the humanities.

Programmes
The Culture and Science City has two campuses; the first is located in 6 October City, and the second campus in a Sheraton hotel. The component institutions are distributed thus:

6 October Campus 
 Higher Institute of Engineering
 Higher Institute for Mass Media and Communication Techniques;
 Higher Institute for Computer Science and Information Systems;
 Higher Institute of Languages;
 Higher Institute of Administrative Sciences;
 Higher Institute of Economics and Environment;
 Higher Institute for Social Work;

Sheraton Campus
 Higher Institute for Optics Technology;
 Egyptian Higher Institute for Tourism and Hotels;
 Higher Institute for Languages - (Sheraton Buildings).

External links

References

Universities in Egypt
6th of October (city)
Educational institutions established in 1994
1994 establishments in Egypt